Siciska  is a village in the administrative district of Gmina Lipce Reymontowskie, within Skierniewice County, Łódź Voivodeship, in central Poland.

The village has an approximate population of 160.

References

Siciska